Knives Out! is an American alternative metal band consisting of members of Dog Fashion Disco, Hellyeah, Nothingface, and Polkadot Cadaver. Stylistically, they are heavier than front man Todd Smith and guitarist Jasan Stepp's other bands Dog Fashion Disco and Polkadot Cadaver.

History
Knives Out! formed in 2008 with members of Dog Fashion Disco, Hellyeah, Nothingface, and Polkadot Cadaver and began work on their debut album in mid-2009. They released a four-track EP titled The Rough Cuts in 2010 and full debut album, titled Black Mass Hysteria, on February 14, 2012 on the band's label Razor to Wrist Records.

A music video has been made for the song Blood Everywhere, and a lyric video for Robot Babylon.

Band members

 Todd Smith – lead vocals (2008–present)
 Tom Maxwell – lead guitar (2008–present)
 Jasan Stepp – rhythm guitar (2008–present)
 David Cullen – bass (2008–present)
 Tommy Sickles – drums, percussion (2008–present)

Discography

References

Heavy metal musical groups from Maryland
Musical groups from Baltimore
American alternative metal musical groups
Musical groups established in 2006
Musical quintets
2006 establishments in Maryland